The Škoda 109E locomotive (also marketed as Emil Zátopek locomotive) was originally conceived in 2004 and designed for operation in Austria, Germany, Hungary, Poland and Slovakia as well as the Czech Republic.  The 109E Škoda has a top speed of 200 km/h and is compatible with both AC and DC catenaries, meeting the basic characteristics of a modern multisystem locomotive.

ČD Class 380 

In 2005 České dráhy ordered 20 locomotives with delivery in 2009 and certifications for service in all of the above-mentioned countries. The first locomotive was actually delivered in 2010 and lacked any national service certification (only trial service certification for the Czech Republic), as result České dráhy refused to accept the locomotives. In April 2013 the locomotive class received its TSI certificate and the manufacturer hopes that it will receive national service certifications soon (especially for Czech Republic, Austria and Poland).

ZSSK Class 381
Škoda's first export order for 109Es came from ZSSK in Slovakia. Initially two locomotives were ordered. These were made at the Škoda factory in Plzeň. The locomotive class received Slovak service certification in 2012. Locomotives are designated as class 381 of ZSSK, numbers 381.001-7 & 381.002-5 and are being used mostly on regional trains on the Bratislava - Trnava - Leopoldov route.

DB Class 102
In June 2013 Skoda Transportation announced that it won a tender for 6 Push–pull trainsets for DB Regio including 6 109Es designated as DB Class 102. The tender included a requirement for  speed, as the trainsets will be used on the Nuremberg–Munich high-speed railway. Trainsets were expected to be delivered in 2016. But the vehicles were not authorized by EBA authority until 2019, yet with restrictions. DB Regio refused to accept the trains due to poor reliability, with the fleet finally beginning entry to service on the 12th October 2020, some four years late.

See also

 List of Škoda Transportation products

References 

Škoda locomotives
Railway locomotives introduced in 2008
Standard gauge locomotives of Austria
Standard gauge locomotives of Germany
Standard gauge locomotives of Hungary
Standard gauge locomotives of Poland
Standard gauge locomotives of the Czech Republic
Standard gauge locomotives of Slovakia
Electric locomotives of Germany
Bo′Bo′ electric locomotives of Europe